Kenny Dillingham (born April 28, 1990) is an American football coach who is currently the head football coach at Arizona State University. He previously served as the offensive coordinator at the University of Oregon, Florida State University, Auburn University. and the University of Memphis.

Coaching career

Early coaching career
Dillingham began his coaching career at 17 years old, after he tore his ACL during his senior year. He started off working with the junior varsity team at Chaparral High School before being promoted to the offensive coordinator of the varsity team at 21 years old. While he was coaching at Chaparral, he went to Arizona State University, graduating in 2012 with a degree in interdisciplinary studies. He was hired to be an offensive assistant at Arizona State in 2014 under offensive coordinator Mike Norvell, whom he had met while coaching at Chaparral.

Memphis
After Norvell was hired to be the head coach at Memphis in 2016, Dillingham was hired as a graduate assistant for the Tigers. Dillingham spent the 2016 season as the de facto quarterbacks coach, since the team did not have an official quarterbacks coach. After Tigers offensive coordinator Chip Long left to be the offensive coordinator at Notre Dame, Dillingham was named the official quarterbacks coach for Memphis and added tight ends coach to his duties for 2017. After Long's successor Darrell Dickey left for Texas A&M, Dillingham was promoted to offensive coordinator for the 2018 season. In 2017-2018 Memphis had back to back top 5 offenses in college football. While at Memphis Dillingham was rated the #1 recruiter in conference by the 247 recruiter rankings.

Auburn
Dillingham was hired by Gus Malzahn to be the offensive coordinator and quarterbacks coach at Auburn in 2019, replacing Chip Lindsey.  During his time at Auburn he helped Bo Nix become the SEC Rookie of the Year while leading the most improved offense in the SEC. He spent one season with the Tigers, where they recorded a 9-3 record averaging 33.2 points per game. Auburn also had its highest recruiting ranking in the 247 recruiting ranking era during Dillingham’s year as OC.

Florida State
After Norvell left Memphis to be the next head coach at Florida State, Dillingham departed Auburn to join Florida State as their offensive coordinator and quarterbacks coach, replacing Kendal Briles.

Oregon
On December 17, 2021, Dillingham was hired as the offensive coordinator and quarterbacks coach at the University of Oregon under head coach Dan Lanning.

Arizona State
On November 27, 2022, Dillingham was named the 26th head coach at Arizona State University, replacing Herm Edwards. He is the first Sun Devil alumnus and native Arizonan to hold this position.

Personal life
Dillingham and his wife, Briana, have one child.

Head coaching record

References

External links
 Arizona State profile
 Florida State profile
 Kenny Dillingham on Twitter

1990 births
Living people
Arizona State Sun Devils football coaches
Auburn Tigers football coaches
Florida State Seminoles football coaches
Memphis Tigers football coaches
Oregon Ducks football coaches
High school football coaches in Arizona
Arizona State University alumni
Sportspeople from Phoenix, Arizona
Sportspeople from Scottsdale, Arizona
Coaches of American football from Arizona